Elophila fulvalis is a moth in the family Crambidae. It was described by George Hampson in 1899. It is found in South America, where it has been recorded from Paraná, Brazil.

References

Acentropinae
Moths described in 1899
Moths of South America